The Old Ship Inn is a public house in  Perth, Perth and Kinross, Scotland. While the current building is late Victorian, an Old Ship Inn has been on the site since at least 1665. The inn was close to the original Perth mercat cross, which was moved when it was rebuilt. The inn's name references its proximity to Perth's original harbour, which lay at the end of the High Street.

Although its address is given as High Street, its entrance on the medieval Skinnergate is more notable.

It has been owned by Belhaven Brewery.

References

External links

Pubs in Scotland
19th-century establishments in Scotland
Buildings and structures in Perth, Scotland